The Border Legion is a 1916 Western novel written by Zane Grey, first published by Harper & Brothers in 1916.

Plot
It tells the story of a cold hearted man named Jack Kells who falls in love with Miss Joan Randle, a girl his legion has taken captive near the Idaho border.

Adaptations
The Border Legion was adapted to film, in 1918, 1924, 1930, and in 1940. The film The Last Round-Up (1934) starring Randolph Scott, was also based on the novel.

External links
 

1916 American novels
Novels by Zane Grey
Western (genre) novels
American novels adapted into films
Novels set in Idaho